The 2nd Annual Tranny Awards was a pornographic awards event recognizing the best in transgender pornography form the previous year from November 1, 2008 to 31 October 2009. Nominations were announced online in December, 2009 online at trannyawards.com. The winners were announced online on January 9, 2010. The winners were decided by a panel of industry judges.

This was a continuation of the first awards dedicated to recognising achievements in transgender pornography. Steven Grooby the founder of the awards stated that he wanted to address the lack of representation of transgender performers in awards.

Grooby stated "we feel the main adult industry marginalizes our niche" and "Running these awards allows us to give back something to the community of models and producers who keep this industry growing.

Winners and nominees
The nominees for the 2nd Tranny Awards were announced in December, 2009, online on the trannyawards.com website. The winners were announced during the awards on January 9, 2010, with the awards presented later on March 4, 2010.

Awards

Winners are listed first, highlighted in boldface.

References

Transgender Erotica Awards
Pornographic film awards
21st-century awards
American pornographic film awards
Annual events in the United States
Awards established in 2008
Culture of Los Angeles
Adult industry awards